Thierry Crétier (born 3 August 1972) is a retired French professional footballer who played as a defender].

Personal life
Crétier is the father of the footballer Noah Crétier.

Honours

Club
OGC Nice
 Coupe de France: 1997

References

External links
FDB Profile

1972 births
Living people
Sportspeople from Besançon
French footballers
OGC Nice players
Nîmes Olympique players
JS Saint-Pierroise players
Stade de Reims players
Association football defenders
Ligue 1 players
Ligue 2 players
Footballers from Bourgogne-Franche-Comté